Jack Clarence Nix (November 8, 1917 – December 29, 1990) was an American football wing back. A native of Moselle, Mississippi, he played college football for Mississippi State from 1937 to 1939. Nix’s college nickname was “Phantom” because he ran so fast that if an opponent blinked, Nix disappeared. Holds school record for most interceptions in one game with 4 against Arkansas (’39) and he holds school record for most net yards gained in one game and longest pass interception with 97 against Ole Miss (’38). This was a SEC record for several decades until broken in the early 2000's. He was selected by the Cleveland Rams in the 17th round (155th overall pick) of the 1940 NFL Draft. He appeared in one NFL game during the 1940 season.  He served in the Army during World War II and the Korean War. He served in the Pacific Theater of Operations and in the occupation of Japan. He moved to Starkville in 1953 where he coached football. He was the principal at Starkville High School from 1956 to 1976. He and his wife, Mary Elizabeth Hartness Nix (b.1919-d.2012), had three sons (Jack Jr, Larry, and Mike). He died in 1990 at age 73. Among the mourners at Nix's funeral was his friend, the late Mississippi Congressman G. V. "Sonny" Montgomery.

References

1917 births
1990 deaths
Cleveland Rams players
Mississippi State Bulldogs football players
Players of American football from Mississippi